Figes is a surname. Notable people with the surname include:

Craig Figes (born 1978), British water polo player 
Eva Figes (1932–2012), English author and feminist
Kevin Figes, British saxophonist, flutist, bandleader, and composer
Orlando Figes, British historian and author